Dog food is food specifically intended for consumption by dogs.

Dog food or dogfood may also refer to:

 Dog Food (EP), an  EP by Mondo Generator
 Dog meat, human consumption of canines
 Eating your own dog food, internal use of a company's own products